is a passenger railway station in the city of Matsudo, Chiba, Japan, operated by East Japan Railway Company (JR East).

Lines
Only all-stations "Local" services stop here.

Station layout
The station consists of a single island platform serving two tracks, connected by a footbridge. The station is staffed.

Platforms

History
The station was used only on race days for the adjacent Matsudo Racetracks. It was elevated to a permanent station on December 25, 1958. The station was absorbed into the JR East network upon the privatization of JNR on April 1, 1987.

Passenger statistics
In fiscal 2019, the station was used by an average of 21,606 passengers daily.

Surrounding area
 Matsudo Race Tracks
Senshu University Matsudo Junior High School / High School / Kindergarten

See also
 List of railway stations in Japan

References

External links

 JR East Station information 

Railway stations in Chiba Prefecture
Railway stations in Japan opened in 1952
Jōban Line
Matsudo